Yang Lina may refer to

 Yang Lina (actress) (1963-2010), Singaporean actress
 Yang Lina (footballer) (born 1994), Chinese footballer